is the SD Gundam series for 2007 and the 18th work in the Musha Gundam series. The story and characters are modeled after those featured in the classic 14th century Chinese literature, Romance of the Three Kingdoms by Luo Guanzhong. However, certain story elements, as well as the names of the Three Kingdoms themselves, are fictionalized.

There are three chapters under this title, entitled Fuuun Gouketsu Hen, Eiyuu Gekitotsu Hen and Senjin Kettou Hen. It also has a side story, Sangokuden Gaiden Buyuu Gekitou Roku.

Outline 
"BB Senshi" is a 20th anniversary commemorative work with the motif of "Romance of the Three Kingdoms." The various mobile suits become "actors (演者)" to take on the roles of various characters of Chinese literature. This further emphasizes Sangokuden as "a performance of Romance of the Three Kingdoms by the SD Gundams." The usual name "頑駄無 (Gundam)" used in the "Sengokuden" series has been replaced with the katakana "ガンダム (Gundam)". The warring states world view closely resembles that of the "Sengokuden" series. Certain aspects of the "actors" taking on the roles resemble the mobile suits they were originally based on.

In "Mirisha", the stage of "Sangokuden", there exist 130 scrolls of historical text. In the current time they are called "G Chronicle (G記)". It reveals that "Mirisha" was the country "Abram" (from the "Sengokuden" series) in the past and the first emperor is "Hakuryuu Taitei" from Shin SD Sengokuden Densetsu no Daishougun Hen however this crossover was not explained in the main story. (Therefore, it could probably mean this is another "Abram" of a parallel world like that of Musharetsuden)

The series was announced to be released in a number of territories, including Japan, Korea, America and Australia. However, as of 2009 only releases in Asian regions have followed. A range of related merchandise has been produced including modelling tools, snack foods and orange juice.

Whilst the series is still ongoing, a new Sengokuden model kit series has been announced to begin in July 2009. The kits will be remolded from kits released for SD Gundam Force Emaki Musharetsuden, based on previous designs which have styled these Gundams after famous historical samurai. It is currently unknown if related fiction will be produced for these kits or if they will crossover into Sangokuden.

Story 
 Gathering of the Heroes Chapter
It was the times of war in the continent of Mirisha, a time where the three kingdoms of Shou, Gou and Giga struggle for power and authority. Before the three countries become established, the rebellion of the Yellow Scarves has allowed Toutaku (Dong Zhuo) to seize control over the government, he killed Reitei (Han Ling Di) the emperor of that time and stole the "Gyokuji (玉璽)", then promoted himself to Prime Minister spreading tyranny through the land. But a year after, the anti-Toutaku (Dong Zhuo) spirits are on the rise because of the discovery of Reitei's (Han Lin Di's) assassination, Enshuu (Shou/Shu Kingdom) was quick on gathering troops and with Sousou (Cao Cao) on board the anti-Toutaku  alliance is formed. Heroes from all over gather under the anti-Toutaku banner, including Ryuubi's (Liu Bei's) Yuushu Resistance. The anti-Toutaku allied forces fought against the Toutaku (Dong Zhuo) Troops at the Korou Fortress (Hu Lao Guan) which is just outside Rakuyou.

This chapter parallels the Yellow Turban Rebellion and the Battle of Hulao Pass.

Clash of the Heroes Chapter
The anti-Toutaku (Dong Zhuo) alliance was disbanded after the defeat of Toutaku, the heroes each return to their homeland, expanding their territory and causing conflicts. With the death of Sonken Zephyranthes (Sun Jian), his son Sonsaku (Sun Ce) is aiming to stabilize the situation in Koto. Sousou (Cao Cao) has clashed with the Hero of Kahoku, Enshou (Yuan Shao). Ryuubi (Liu Bei) has travelled far from his homeland Yuushu to Keishuu to seek help from the famous strategist, Koumei (Kong Ming).

This chapter parallels the Battle of Guandu and the events eventually leading to the Battle of Red Cliffs.

Battle of the War Gods
The battle of Red Cliff ended with the victory of Ryuubi (Liu Bei) and Sonken (Sun Quan) army, the land is split into three kingdoms – Shou, Giga and Gou. But there is no news of the missing Sousou (Cao Cao) and Ryuubi (Liu Bei). On the empty throne of Shou is the Ryuuteiken and ascending the throne of Giga is son of Sousou (Cao Cao), Souhi (Cao Pi). Souhi leads Giga to a campaign to conquer the land westwards. On the barren lands of Seiryou stands one man, Bachou (Ma Chao), burning with flames of revenge. The Giga Troops are said to be dark zombies with burning red eyes and are impossible to kill. Later in the series, the god of war, Shuu, returns.

This chapter parallels the events after the formation of the Three Kingdoms themselves.

Side Story: Heroic Clash Chronicles
As time gradually progress towards the Red Cliff Battle, a whistling lone warrior wanders Mirisha. The warrior bearing the same name as the past ruler of So "Kouseki" encounters other warriors at various places, often engaging in clashes with them. And now after many struggles he finally arrive at his homeland Kishuu, the land soon to be the battlefield of the Red Cliffs and the land last known as "So"...

The stories of the heroes not touched on in the main story, told in 12 episodes through the manga in the instruction sheet of the model kits in the series. The key character of this side story is Kouseki Turn-X (Xiang Yu).

The story is set before the Battle of the Red Cliffs and parallels the Chu–Han contention.

Brave Battle Warriors
BBW, to some extent, can be considered as the fourth part of Sangokuden, and is played out in anime and plamodel series. Storywise, it follows the past series but with the addition of more details like Sousou's attempt to assassinate Toutaku. With the anime as the main story, the plamodel series serves as a digest for the parts involving the character. Even though both series are on the same timeline, there are exceptions where the anime vary from the plamodel series. There are also characters original to the anime.

Brave Battle Warriors Genesis
The manga serialization in Gundam Ace. It focus on episodes not shown in the anime's main story.

Theme song 
Mirisha Legend ~The Brave Legend~
(三璃紗伝說 ~The Brave Legend~)
Japanese version: Ko-saku
Mandarin and Cantonese versions: Ekin Cheng
Korean version: Kim Woo Joo

This song is featured in the promotional animation of the series. This mostly still frame animation is designed to be played at hobby shops and promotional events, introducing most of the main characters. The video was also presented in a 2007 DVD boxset of older SD Gundam animated works, as part of a feature on the history of SD Gundam. Currently this song is being used for the ending theme of the anime SD Gundam Sangokuden Brave Battle Warriors.

Manga 
Kōichi Tokita drew the first chapter of the manga titled  which was serialized in volumes 7 to 12 of Comic Bom Bom in 2007. Kentarō Yano continues with the second chapter of the series titled  which will serialize in Kerokero Ace from volume 2 of 2008 to volume 4 of 2009.

The third chapter  starts from Kero Kero Ace volume 5 of 2009 and will be drawn by Naoto Tsushima. With the unknown fate of Ryuubi (Liu Bei) Gundam, the lead character of the third chapter is announced to be Bachou Blue Destiny.

Anime 

An anime adaptation for Sangokuden was announced on October 8, 2009, during the 49th All Japan Plamodel Hobby Show.  Kadokawa Pictures confirmed at a Tokyo press conference on December 9, 2009, that the anime adaptation would first arrive as a theatrical film. Chō Denei-ban SD Gundam Sangokuden Brave Battle Warriors opened in Japan on February 27, 2010, in a double billing with the fifth Sgt. Frog (Keroro Gunsō) film, Chō Gekijō-ban Keroro Gunsō Tanjō! Kyūkyoku Keroro Kiseki no Jikūjima de Arimasu!! Sunrise produced both films.

Besides the movie, a 51-episode TV animated series was produced starting April 3, 2010. Each episode is estimated to air for 15 minutes.

Games 
A series of mobile phone games are made by Taiwan company, Joymaster in collaboration with Bandai-Namco:
BB戦士三国伝  – a time attack game
BB戦士三国伝  – a fighting game
BB戦士三国伝  – a mahjong game
BB戦士三国伝  – a Bejeweled style game
BB戦士三国伝 
BB戦士三国伝 
BB戦士三国伝 
BB戦士三国伝 

Besides the above games, Bandai-Namco has announced an upcoming game, SDガンダム三国伝 Brave Battle Warriors 真三璃紗大戦 (SD Gundam Sangokuden Brave Battle Warriors Shin Mirisha Taisen), and it is slated to be released on 2 December 2010 for the Nintendo DS handheld.
It looks to be a hack 'n' slash type of game, where the player is able to form a 3-man group, and there's over 40 playable characters.
A special promotion of the game comes with a limited edition DX boxset of Shin Kouseki Turn-X (項羽ターンX) VS Ryuuhou Ryuubi Gundam (劉邦劉備ガンダム, whose character basis is Liu Bang), never before seen model kits of the two.

A teaser site has been opened, and basically reiterates the revealed information thus far. The main story plot in the game goes up to the Battle of the Red Cliffs, and besides characters from the 3 factions (Shou, Giga, Gou), players can also choose to play as the other characters like the Yellow Scarves, Toutaku, Enshou, Enjyutsu, and even the generic GM/Zaku Infantry troops.

Some characters from the series were confirmed to appear in the upcoming PlayStation Portable game SD Gundam G Generation World.

Model Kits 
The focal point of the series is a range of model kits, produced as part of Bandai's BB Senshi line.

References

External links 
Official site
Asia official site
Comic Bom Bom Site
Official site for the Brave Battle Warriors anime

2007 manga
Kōichi Tokita
Works based on Romance of the Three Kingdoms
SD Gundam